Jianzhou or Jian Prefecture is the name of a number of former prefectures in China. It may refer to:

Written as 建州
 Jianzhou (Fujian), in roughly modern Jian'ou, Fujian
 Jian ware or Jianzhou ware, produced in Jianzhou
 Jianzhou of Balhae/Bohai, in modern Dongning, Heilongjiang
 Jianzhou Guard, home of the Jianzhou Jurchens

 Jianzhou, in roughly modern Jincheng, Shanxi
 Jianzhou, in roughly modern Yunan, Guangdong
 Jianzhou, in roughly modern Shangcheng County, Henan
 Jianzhou, in roughly modern Shaoyang, Hunan
 Jianzhou, in roughly modern Fuzhou, Fujian
 Jianzhou of Liao, in roughly modern Chaoyang County, Liaoning

Written as 劍州 / 剑州
 Jianzhou, in roughly modern Ngawa County, Sichuan
 Jianzhou, in roughly modern Jiange County, Sichuan
 Jianzhou or South Jianzhou, in roughly modern Nanping, Fujian

Written as 簡州 / 简州
 Jianzhou, in roughly modern Heng County, Guangxi
 Jianzhou, in roughly modern Jianyang, Sichuan
 Jianzhou, in roughly modern Danyang, Jiangsu

See also
Jian Zhou